General Sir William Thompson Adair  (21 June 1850 – 29 December 1931) was a Royal Marines officer and Ulster Unionist.

Biography
Educated at Cheltenham College, he entered the Royal Marine Light Infantry as a lieutenant on 6 December 1867, and was promoted to captain on 1 July 1881. He received the brevet rank of major on 6 December 1888, the substantive rank of major on 3 May 1889, the brevet rank of lieutenant colonel on 6 December 1895, and the substantive rank of lieutenant colonel on 7 February 1896. In early February 1900 he embarked the SS Canada leaving Southampton for South Africa, where he was to serve in the Second Boer War. He received the brevet rank of colonel on 7 February 1900, and was appointed Assistant Adjutant General on 1 November 1900. Following his return to the United Kingdom, he was promoted colonel second commandant of the Royal Marine Light Infantry on 30 January 1902. He became Deputy Adjutant-General Royal Marines (the professional head of the Royal Marines) June 1907 before retiring in June 1911.

Adair played a prominent role in the Ulster Unionist Party and was commander of the Antrim Ulster Volunteer Force. In 1914, he took charge of the landing and dispersal of guns during the Larne gun-running.

References

Sources
 D.J.Hickey & J.E.Doherty. A Dictionary of Irish History. Gill & MacMillan. Ireland 1980. p3 

1850 births
1931 deaths
Royal Marines generals
Royal Navy personnel of the Second Boer War
People educated at Cheltenham College
Ulster Volunteers
Knights Commander of the Order of the Bath
High Sheriffs of Antrim
People from County Antrim